Catherine J. Bell (born October 25, 1954 in Comox, British Columbia) is a Canadian trade unionist and politician. She was elected as the New Democratic Party's candidate in the 2006 federal election in the riding of Vancouver Island North, serving for one term. While in Parliament, she served as the NDP's critic for natural resources.

Bell lives with her husband, Roger Kishi, in Cumberland, British Columbia. She previously served as vice-president of the B.C. Government and Service Employees Union. She is a member of the Social Planning and Research Council of B.C. and she has served on the social justice committee of the B.C. Federation of Labour. She is also a member and volunteer with the World Community Development Education Society, Co-Development Canada, the Comox Valley Coalition to Save Social Programs and the Comox Valley Women to Women Global Strategies.

Bell has continued with electoral reform work in parliament championed by Ed Broadbent in the 38th Canadian Parliament through a defeated bill  and petition.

In the 2004 federal election, she finished second in Vancouver Island North, losing to Conservative Party of Canada incumbent John Duncan by 483 votes. In the 2006 federal election she defeated Duncan by 630 votes (23561 to 22931). However, in the 2008 election, she was unseated by Duncan by over 2400 votes.

A record of Bell's statements in the House is available.

References

External links 
 New Democratic Party's Official Website
   Catherine Bell's Official Website 
 

1954 births
Living people
New Democratic Party MPs
Members of the House of Commons of Canada from British Columbia
Women members of the House of Commons of Canada
Women in British Columbia politics
21st-century Canadian politicians
21st-century Canadian women politicians
People from Comox, British Columbia